North light or North Light can refer to:

North Light - a racehorse
North light (architecture) - light entering a building from the north
the windows provided in a Saw-tooth roof to let light in from north
a film scanner produced by the FilmLight company 
North Light Books United States art publisher
Block Island North Light lighthouse on Block Island, Rhode Island
Grand Island North Light lighthouse on the north end of Grand Island